The WCML-TV Tower Atlanta, also known as the WCMU-TV Tower Atlanta, was a  tall guyed mast for the transmission of radio and television programs located  north of the unincorporated city of Atlanta, Michigan in Montmorency Township. This tower was (as is the current tower) used by WCMU-TV and WCMU-FM to broadcast their signals. The new tower is not the tallest tower in Michigan with several being taller, including: WJMN-TV (at ), WFQX-TV (at ), and WEYI-TV  (at ).

See also 
 List of masts
 Tallest structures in the U.S.
 List of the world's tallest structures

References

External links
  Current Tower
  Old/Replaced Tower
 
WCMU Website

Towers completed in 1975
Towers in Michigan
Buildings and structures in Montmorency County, Michigan
Radio masts and towers in the United States
1975 establishments in Michigan
2010 disestablishments in Michigan